The 2008 Speedway World Cup Event 1 was the first meeting of the 2009 Speedway World Cup tournament. It took place on 11 July 2009 in the Speedway Center in Vojens, Denmark. The meeting was won by the Russian team and they qualified directly for the World Cup Final in Leszno, Poland. Sweden and host team Denmark qualified for the Race-Off. The last placed team, the Czech Republic, were knocked out of the competition.

Results

Heat details

Heat after heat 
 N.Pedersen, Povazhny, A.Dryml, Lindbäck
 Gizatullin, Lindgren, B.Pedersen, Rymel (T)
 Ruud, Gafurov, Klindt, L.Dryml
 Bjerre, Sayfutdinov, Jonsson, Franc
 Davidsson, Laguta, Kůs, Iversen Iversen - bail on first corner
 Jonsson, Iversen, Povazhny, L.Dryml (F3)
 Davidsson, N.Pedersen, Franc, Gizatullin
 Gafurov, B.Pedersen, Lindbäck, Kůs Damp track - rain started
 Sayfutdinov, Klindt, Lindgren, A.Dryml Race restart - false start
 Bjerre, Laguta, Ruud, Rymel
 Povazhny, B.Pedersen, Ruud, Franc
 Jonsson, Klindt, Gizatullin, Kůs
 Bjerre, Gafurov, Davidsson, A.Dryml
 Sayfutdinov, Lindbäck, Iversen, Rymel
 Lindgren, L.Dryml, Pedersen (F/N), Laguta (Fx) Race stopped - Pedersen and Laguta hooked together and crashed into barrier. Laguta excluded. Pedersen injured - no substitute.
 Povazhny, Davidsson, Klindt, Rymel
 Bjerre, Gizatullin, L.Dryml, Lindbäck
 Lindgren, Gafurov, Iversen, Franc
 Sayfutdinov, Ruud, Kůs
 Laguta, Jonsson, A.Dryml, B.Pedersen
 Bjerre, Lindgren, Povazhny, Kůs Wet track - more rain
 Gizatullin, Iversen, A.Dryml (2 pts), Ruud
 Bjerre (6 pts), Jonsson (4 pts), Gafurov, Rymel
 Sayfutdinov, L.Dryml, Davidsson, B.Pedersen
 Lindbäck, Klindt, Laguta, Franc

References

See also 
 2009 Speedway World Cup
 Motorcycle speedway

E1